Cheryl Lynne Van Kuren (born August 1, 1964 in Allentown, Pennsylvania) is a former field hockey player from the United States who finished in eighth place with Team USA at the 1988 Summer Olympics in Seoul.

She played collegiate field hockey at Old Dominion University in Norfolk, Virginia from 1982 to 1985. She later earned an MBA from the University of Baltimore.

External links
 Cheryl Van Kuren at sports-reference
 

1964 births
Living people
21st-century American women
American female field hockey players
Field hockey players at the 1988 Summer Olympics
Old Dominion University alumni
Olympic field hockey players of the United States
Sportspeople from Allentown, Pennsylvania
University of Baltimore alumni